Coleman Bluffs are a loose chain of rock and ice bluffs that trend generally north–south for , situated near the center of the Outback Nunataks, about  northwest of Mount Weihaupt, Victoria Land, Antarctica. The feature was mapped by the United States Geological Survey from surveys and U.S. Navy air photos, 1959–64, and named by the Advisory Committee on Antarctic Names for Harold L. Coleman, meteorologist at the South Pole Station, 1968. The bluffs lie situated on the Pennell Coast, a portion of Antarctica lying between Cape Williams and Cape Adare.

References 

Cliffs of Victoria Land
Pennell Coast